Here is a list of the Best Indian Films as voted by Bengal Film Journalists' Association as part of their annual awards.

In most years the films are listed in order of merit as voted by the jury of the association.

1939
Source
Best Indian Film
 Aadmi
Best Bengali Film
 Jiban Maran
Best Hindi Film
Aadmi
Best Foreign Film
Pygmalion

1940

Best Indian Film
Aurat
Best Bengali Film
 Doctor
Best Hindi Film
Aurat
Best Foreign Film
Gone With The Wind

1941
Source
Indian films
Pratisruti
Padosi
Sikandar
Naya Sansar
Khazanchi
Parichay
Punar Milan
Pardesi
Raj Nartaki
Nandini

Foreign films
Citizen Kane
Kitty Foyle
Hold Back the Dawn
The Letter
The Philadelphia Story
Meet John Doe
Blossoms in the Dust
The Great Dictator
My Life with Caroline
Back Street

1942
Source

Indian films
Apna Ghar
Garmil
Bondi
Bharat Milap
Saugandh
Doctor
Kunwara Baap
Basant
Shesh Uttar
Lagan

Foreign films
How Green Was My Valley
Fantasia
H. M. Pulham, Esq.
Ball of Fire
It Started With Eve
Suspicion
Two-Faced Woman
The Little Foxes
Pimpernel Smith
Reap The Wild Wind

1944
Source
Indian films
Ram Shastri
Udayer Pathey
Shakuntala
Wapas
Sondhi
Parakh
Dasi
Fashion
Chhadmabeshi
Zameen

Foreign films
The Song of Bernadette
Madam Curie
Since You Went Away
For Whom The Bell Tolls
It Happened Tomorrow
Constant Nymph
Going My Way
Mission to Moscow
Heaven Can Wait
Jane Eyre and The North Star

1945
Source
Bhabhi Kaal
Parbat Pe Apna Dera
Dui Purush
Kashinath
Ek Din Ka Sultan
Aaina
Din Raat
Mun-Ki-Jit
Devdasi
Mazdoor

Foreign films
Gaslight
The Lost Weekend
Arsenic and Old Lace
A Song to Remember
Wilson
A Thousand And One Nights
Henry V
Dragon Seed
The Seventh Cross
The Picture of Dorian Gray

1961
Source
Indian films
Teen Kanya
Gunga Jumna
Punasha
Madhya Rater Tara
Saptapadi
Kanoon
Char Diwari
Usne Kaha Tha
Jis Desh Men Ganga Behti Hai
Swayambara

Foreign films
Ben-Hur
Apartment
Kanał
Devochka Ishchet Otsa
The Millionairess
On The Beach
South Pacific
Pepe
The Singer Not the Song
Elmer Gantry

1962
Source
Indian films
Abhijan
Kanchanjangha
Kancher Swarga
Dada Thakur
Sahib Bibi Aur Ghulam
Bhagini Nivedita
Sautela Bhai
Hansuli Banker Upakatha
Arati
Benarasi

Foreign films
Two Women
The Naked Island
Ballad of a Soldier
Come September
The Guns of Navarone
The Longest Day
Spartacus
La Dolce Vita
Sleeping Beauty
Psycho

1963
Source
Indian Films 
Mahanagar
Nirjan Saikate
Bandini
Saat Pake Bandha
Palatak
Uttar Falguni
Gumrah
Nisithe
Chhaya Surya
Dil Ek Mandir

Foreign films
The Birds
Judgment at Nuremberg
The World of Suzie Wong
The Cranes Are Flying
Can-Can
To Kill a Mockingbird
The Loudest Whisper
The V.I.P.s
El Cid
A Very Private Affair

1964
Source

Indian films
Charulata
Arohi
Dosti
Shehar Aur Sapna
Pratinidhi
Jotugriha
Anushtup Chanda
Door Gagan Ki Chhaon Men
Jiban Kahini
Sangam

Foreign films
The Night of the Iguana
West Side Story
Parent Trap
The Condemned of Altona
Lilies of the Field
Charade
Five Miles to Midnight
Hatari!
Leopard
Hud

1965
Source
Indian films
Atithi
Subarnarekha
Haqeeqat
Eki Ange Eto Rup
Kapurush o Mahapurush
Raja Ram Mohan
Baksho Badal
Akash Kusum
Aarzoo
Geet Gaya Patharon Ne

Foreign films
My Fair Lady
The Visit
Divorce Italian Style

1966
Source

Indian films
Teesri Kasam
Nayak
Shaheed
Guide
Galpo Holeo Satti
Mamta
Kanch Kata Hirey
Gaban
Subhashchandra
Aasman Mahal

Foreign films
Lawrence of Arabia
Love at Twenty
Yesterday, Today and Tomorrow

1967
Source

Indian films
Chhuti
Balika Badhu
Anupama
Kedar Raja
Shakespeare Wallah
Uski Kahani
Aakhri Khat
Hatey Bazarey
Upkar
Milan

Foreign films
Dr. Zhivago
Who's Afraid of Virginia Woolf?
Zorba The Greek

1968
Source
Indian films
Apanjan
Majhli Didi
Chotto Jigyasa
Sunghursh
Aadmi
Chowringhee
Baghini
Raja Aur Runk
Hamraaz
Charan Kavi Mukundadas

Foreign films
The Agony and the Ecstasy
Fahrenheit 451
Lord Jim

1969
Source
Indian films
Bhuvan Shome
Goopy Gyne Bagha Byne
Aashirwad
Saraswatichandra
Anokhi Raat
Arogya Niketan
Natun Pata
Rahgir
Nannha Farishta
Parineeta

Foreign film
2001: A Space Odyssey
Rosemary's Baby
Bonnie and Clyde

1970
Source

Indian films
Pratidwandi
Mera Naam Joker
Sagina Mahato
Interview
Samaj Ko Badal Dalo
Diba Ratrir Kabya
Satyakam
Safar
Darpan
Aranyer Din Ratri

Foreign films
Blowup
The Graduate
Blow Hot, Blow Cold

1971
Source

Indian films
Nimantran
Anand
Seemabaddha
Chetna
Sara Akash
Malyadan
Guddi
Ekhonee
Tere Mere Sapne
Khamoshi

Foreign films
Charly
Woodstock
Midnight Cowboy

1972
Source

Indian films
Anubhav
Phir Bhi
Calcutta 71
Pakeezah
Dastak
Bigalita Karuna Janhabi Jamuna
Uphaar
Hare Rama Hare Krishna
Memsaab
Bawarchi

Foreign film
Summer of '42

1973
Source

Indian films
Padatik
Achanak
Streer Patra
Saudagar
Ashani Sanket
Koshish
Abhimaan
Shriman Prithviraj
Bilet Pherat
Parichay

Foreign film
Zabriskie Point

1974
Source

Indian films
Ankur
Chorus
Garm Hawa
Rajnigandha
Chhenra Tamsuk
Sonar Kella
Namak Haram
Sujata
Jadubangsha
Phuleswari

Foreign film
The French Connection

1975
Source

Indian films
Nishant
Sansar Simantey
Palanka
Aavishkar
Mili

Foreign film
The Touch

1985
Source

Indian films

Paar
Ghare Baire
Paroma
Aashray
Neelkantha

Foreign film
A Passage to India

1986
Source

Indian films
Kony
Atanka
Party
Ek Pal
Ankahiee

Foreign film
The Killing Fields

1987
Source
Indian films
Mirch Masala
Debshishu
Chopper
Nagpash
Aaj Ka Robinhood

Foreign film
Fanny & Alexander

1988
Source
Indian films
New Delhi Times
Phera
Pestonjee
Utsav
Madhuban

Foreign film
The Sacrifice

1991
Source
Indian films
Ek Doctor Ki Maut
Astuhara
Mahaprithibi
Prahaar: The Final Attack
Drishti

Foreign film
The Whales of August

1992
Source
Indian films
Agantuk
Shakha Proshakha
Goopi Bagha Phire Elo 
Antardhan
Current

1994
Source
Indian films
Wheel Chair
Silpi
Sardar

1995
Source
Indian films
Mammo
Drohkal
Charachar

1996
Source
Indian films
Unishe April
Yuganta
Maachis

1998
Source
Best Hindi film
Godmother

1999
Best Hindi film
Source
Satya

2000
Source
Indian films
Uttara
Paromitar Ekdin
Kichchu Sanglap Kichchu Pralap

2001
Source
Indian films
Utsab
Dekha
Zubeidaa

2002
Source
Indian films
Mr. & Mrs. Iyer
Aamar Bhuban
Sanjh Batir Rupkathara

Hindi film
The Legend of Bhagat Singh

2003
Source
Indian films
Abar Aranye
Chokher Bali
Mondo Meyer Upakhyan

Hindi film
Munna Bhai M.B.B.S.

2004
Source
Indian films
Iti Sreekanta
Mahulbanir Sereng
Abar Asbo Phire
Hindi film
Swades

2005
Source
Indian films
Krantikaal
Nishi Japan
Antarmahal

Hindi film
Black

2005
Source
Indian films
Faltu
Dosar
Bhalobasar Anek Naam

Hindi film
Lage Raho Munnabhai

See also

 Bengal Film Journalists' Association Awards
 Cinema of India

References

External links
 Official Site

Bengal Film Journalists' Association Awards